Fajr Metro Station is a station of Mashhad Metro Line 2. The station opened on 15 February 2017. It is located on North Tabarsi Boulevard. The station is named after Fajr Square, an interchange between Tabarsi Blvd. and the Expressway along north of Mashhad.

References

Mashhad Metro stations
Railway stations opened in 2017
2017 establishments in Iran